{{DISPLAYTITLE:C4H9NO2}}
The molecular formula C4H9NO2 (molar mass: 103.12 g/mol) may refer to:

 α-Aminobutyric acid
 β-Aminobutyric acid
 γ-Aminobutyric acid (GABA)
 2-Aminoisobutyric acid
 3-Aminoisobutyric acid
 Nitroisobutane 
 n-Nitrobutane 
 Butyl nitrite
 Dimethylglycine
 Isobutyl nitrite

Molecular formulas